The Northern Cape Department of Health is the department of the Government of the Northern Cape, responsible for providing public healthcare to the population of the Northern Cape province of South Africa. The political head of the department is the MEC for Health; as of 2020 this is Maruping Lekwene.

References

External links
Official website

Government of the Northern Cape
Northern Cape
Medical and health organisations based in South Africa
Ministries established in 1994